Winogradskyella jejuensis is a Gram-negative and rod-shaped bacterium from the genus of Winogradskyella which has been isolated from the alga Carpopeltis affinis from the coast of the Jeju Island.

References

Flavobacteria
Bacteria described in 2015